Channel was the name of a lightvessel station located in the English Channel between 1979 and August 2021, when it was replaced with a light buoy. It was also one of the 22 coastal weather stations whose conditions were reported in the BBC Shipping Forecast.

The lightvessel marked the western end of the English Channel Traffic Separation Zone.

Signals
The light, on a  tower, had a range of about 15 miles, and flashed for .3 seconds every 15 seconds. The fog signal gave a single 2 second blast every 20 seconds. The agile radio beacon transmitted the letter "O" in morse code on X band and S band frequencies for nine seconds every thirty seconds.

History
The Channel lightvessel was established in 1979 as part of the Off Casquets Traffic Separation Scheme (TSS), introduced following the 1978 grounding of the Amoco Cadiz. The lightvessel was intended to clearly define the TSS, as such schemes were at the time a new feature, rather than marking a physical hazard to navigation.

In May 2021 it was announced that the vessel would be replaced by a Type 1 buoy in August 2021. In August 2021 Trinity House stated that the replacement had been completed, with the Channel Lighted Buoy being deployed by THV Galatea. The light vessel was towed away by THV Patricia.

The light on the buoy flashes every 10 seconds. The agile radio beacon transmits the letter "O" in morse code on X band and S band frequencies for twenty seconds every sixty seconds.

References

External links
 UK Met office weather observations for the past 24 hours at Channel Lighted Buoy

Lightships of the United Kingdom
Lighthouses of the English Channel
Lightship stations